Kand Saban (also Romanized as Kondes Bon; also known as Kajarestāq and Kojā Rūstā) is a village in Garmab Rural District, Chahardangeh District, Sari County, Mazandaran Province, Iran. At the 2006 census, its population was 20, in 7 families.

References 

Populated places in Sari County